Drlače is a village in Serbia. It is situated in the Ljubovija municipality, in the Mačva District of Central Serbia. The village had a Serb ethnic majority and a population of 430 in 2002.

Historical population

1948: 1,380
1953: 1,413
1961: 1,312
1971: 960
1981: 746
1991: 530
2002: 430

References

See also
List of places in Serbia

Populated places in Mačva District
Ljubovija